Barry Lewis may refer to:

 Barry Lewis (cook) (born 1982), British cook and author
 Barry Lewis (cricketer) (born 1952), English cricketer
 Barry Lewis (historian), architectural historian, author and educator